Verdigris is an incorporated town in Rogers County, Oklahoma, United States, in the Tulsa metropolitan area. It straddles former U.S. Highway 66 (now State Highway 66) between Catoosa and Claremore. Verdigris had a population of 3,993 at the 2010 census, an increase of 92.9 percent from 2,070 at the 2000 census.

History
Verdigris is named after the nearby Verdigris River, so named by French traders who settled in the area around the late 1700s. Several Native American tribes, including the Osage, Delaware and Cherokee, had populations along the Verdigris River. The rural community known as Verdigris has been in existence since before Oklahoma statehood in 1907. The St. Louis-San Francisco Railway (Frisco) referred to the area as the "Verdigris Switch" in the late 1880s. Verdigris schools were founded in the early 1900s. America's Mother road, U.S. 66, was routed through Verdigris in the late 1920s.

Verdigris is the fastest growing municipality in Rogers County. The growth rate between 2000 and 2010 was 119%. The population at the 2010 census was 3,993.

Climate
The average annual temperature is 60 degrees. On average, 66 days annually are above 90 degrees, and 25 days annually have a temperature of 20 degrees or lower. The average rainfall is 43.45 inches. The growing season is 208 days.

Demographics

As of the census of 2010, there were 3,993 people living in the Town of Verdigris. There were 1,598 housing units. The racial makeup of Verdigris was 77.41% White, 13.30% Native American, 0.55% Asian, 0.43% Black, 6.74% from 2 or more races, and 1.57% other.

Economy
Verdigris is primarily a small agricultural community. It is also the home of the CF Industries’ Verdigris Nitrogen Facility, which manufactures anhydrous ammonia, urea ammonium nitrate (UAN) solutions, nitric acid, high purity argon and food grade liquid carbon dioxide. The urea ammonium nitrate (UAN) production facility has an annual capacity of 2.0 million tons of UAN and is the second largest such in North America.

Notable people 
Rotnei Clarke - Basketball player
Zach Loyd - Defender/Midfielder for FC Dallas
Steve Gage- Football player for TU then NFL for Washington Redskins

References

Towns in Rogers County, Oklahoma
Towns in Oklahoma